Paradelia intersecta is a species of fly in the family Anthomyiidae. It is found in the  Palearctic . For identification see

References

External links
Images representing Paradelia intersecta at BOLD

Anthomyiidae
Insects described in 1826
Muscomorph flies of Europe